Yasna is the Avestan name of Zoroastrianism's principal act of worship. It is also the name of the primary liturgical collection of Avesta texts, recited during that yasna ceremony.

Overview
The function of the yasna ceremony is, very roughly described, to strengthen the orderly spiritual and material creations of Ahura Mazda against the assault of the destructive forces of Angra Mainyu. The yasna service, that is, the recitation of the Yasna texts, culminates in the apæ zaothra, the "offering to the waters." The ceremony may also be extended by recitation of the Visperad and Vendidad texts. A normal yasna ceremony, without extensions, takes about two hours when it is recited by an experienced priest.

The Yasna texts constitute 72 chapters altogether, composed at different times and by different authors. The middle chapters include the (linguistically) oldest texts of the Zoroastrian canon. These very ancient texts, in the very archaic and linguistically difficult Old Avestan language, include the four most sacred Zoroastrian prayers, and also 17 chapters consisting of the five Gathas, hymns that are considered to have been composed by Zoroaster himself. Several sections of the Yasna include exegetical comments. Yasna chapter and verse pointers are traditionally abbreviated with Y.

The Avestan language word yasna literally means 'oblation' or 'worship'. The word is linguistically and functionally related to Vedic Sanskrit yajna.

The service
The theological function of the yasna ceremony, and the proper performance of it, is to further asha, that is, the ceremony aims to strengthen that which is right/true (one meaning of asha) in the existence/creation (another meaning of asha) of divine order (yet another meaning of asha). The Encyclopedia Iranica summarizes the aim of the yasna ceremony as "the maintenance of the cosmic integrity of the good creation of Ahura Mazdā." Zoroastrianism's cosmological/eschatological perception of the purpose of humankind is to strengthen the orderly spiritual and material creations of Mazda against the assault of the destructive forces of Angra Mainyu. In that conflict, theologically speaking, mankind's primary weapon is the yasna ceremony, which is understood to have a direct, immediate effect: "[f]ar from being a symbolic act, the proper performance of the yasna is what prevents the cosmos from falling into chaos." The culminating act of the yasna ceremony is the Ab-Zohr, the "strengthening of the waters".

The Yasna service, that is, the recitation of the Yasna texts, culminates in the Ab-Zohr, the "offering to waters". The Yasna ceremony may be extended by recitation of the Visperad and Vendidad.

A well-trained priest is able to recite the entire Yasna in about two hours. With extensions, it takes about an hour longer. In its normal form, the Yasna ceremony is only to be performed in the morning.

The liturgy

Structure and organization

"Yasna" also means white rose in arabic.

Content summaries
 Yasna 1 opens with the praise of Ahura Mazda, enumerating his divine titles as the Creator, "radiant, glorious, the greatest, the best, the most beautiful, the most firm, the most wise, of the most perfect form, the highest in righteousness, possessed of great joy, creator, fashioner, nourisher, and the Most Holy Spirit." (Dhalla, 1936:155). Yasna 1 then enumerates the divinities, inviting them to the service.
 Yasna 2, the Barsom Yasht, presents libation and the barsom (a bundle of 23 twigs bound together, symbolizing sanctity) to the invited divinities. Yasna 2–4 complement Yasna 1. Most verses in  Yasna 2–3 begin with the formula ayese yeshti ..., "by means of this sacrifice, I call   …", followed by the name of the divinity being invoked.
 Yasna 3–8 known collectively as the Sarosh dron, presents other offerings (zaothra). Yasna 3 draws the attention of the divinities invoked in Yasna 1, and in Yasna 4, the offerings are consecrated to the divinities. Yasna 5 is repeated in Yasna 37. Yasna 6 is almost identical to the first 10 verses of Yasna 17.
 Yasna 9–11 is the Hom Yasht, a collection of accolades to the Haoma plant and its divinity.
 Yasna 12 constitutes the Fravarane, the Zoroastrian creed and declaration of faith. It is in "Artificial" Gathic Avestan, that is, it is stylistically and linguistically aligned with the language of the Gathas, but imperfectly. The last strophe of verse 7 as well as all of verses 8 and 9 are incorporated into the Kusti ritual.
 Yasna 13–18 are comparable to Yasna 1–8 in that they too are a collection of invocations to the divinities. Chapters 14–18 serve as an introduction to the Staota Yesniia of Yasna 19–59. The first 10 verses of Yasna 17, "to the fires, waters, plants", is almost identical to Yasna 6.
 Yasna 19–21, the Bhagan Yasht, are commentaries on the three 'high prayers' of Yasna 28–53.
 Yasna 22–26 is another set of invocations to the divinities.
 Yasna 27 has the prayers referred to by Yasna 19–21. These are:
 The Ahuna Vairya invocation (also known as the Yatha Ahu Vairyo), the most sacred of all Zoroastrian prayers.
 The Ashem Vohu
 The Yenghe hatam
 Yasna 28–53 include the (linguistically) oldest texts of the Zoroastrian canon. 17 of the 26 chapters make up the Gathas, the most sacred hymns of Zoroastrianism and thought to have been composed by Zoroaster himself. The Gathas are in verse. These are structurally interrupted by a) the Yasna Haptanghaiti ("seven-chapter Yasna", #35–41), which is as old as the Gathas but in prose, b) two short chapters (#42 and #52) that are not as old as the Gathas and Yasna Haptanghaiti.
 Yasna 28–34: Ahunavaiti Gatha
 Yasna 35–41: Yasna Haptanghaiti, the "seven-chapter Yasna", also in Gathic Avestan but in prose.
 Yasna 42: a 4 verse chapter invoking the elements.
 Yasna 43–46: Ushtavait Gatha
 Yasna 47–50: Spenta Mainyu Gatha
 Yasna 51: Vohu Khshathra Gatha
 Yasna 52: an 8 verse hymn to Ashi. Verses 52.5 – 52.8, in Younger Avestan, are a duplicate of Yasna 8.5 – 8.8.
 Yasna 53: Vahishto Ishti Gatha
 Yasna 54 has the text of the a airiiema ishiio, a prayer referred to in Yasna 27.
 Yasna 55 is a praise to the Gathas and the Staota Yesniia.
 Yasna 56 is again an invocation to the divinities, appealing for their attention.
 Yasna 57 is the Sarosh Yasht, the hymn to the divinity of religious discipline. It is closely related to, and appears to have sections borrowed from Yasht 10, the hymn to Mithra.
 Yasna 58 is again a "hidden" Yasht, here to the genius of prayer (cf. Dahman).
 Yasna 59 is a repetition of the sections from Yasna 17 and 26.
 Yasna 60 is blessing upon the house of the ashavan ('just' or 'true' man). Yasna 60.2–7 constitute the  Dahma Afriti invocation, also known as the Afrinagan Dahman.
 Yasna 61 praises the anti-demonic powers imbued in the Afrinagan Dahman, Yenghe hatam and the three principal prayers of Yasna 27.
 Yasna 62 constitutes the Ataksh Nyashes, prayers to fire and its divinity.
 Yasna 63–69 constitute the prayers that accompany the Ab-Zohr, "offering to water".
 Yasna 70–72 are again a set of invocations to the divinities.

Editions

Translations of the Yasna liturgy now in the public domain:
. at avesta.org (organized by chapter).

References

Citations

Bibliography

 . 
 .
 
  
 .
 .
 .

 .

External links
 

Avesta
Ancient Iranian religion
Zoroastrian texts